Twello is a railway station serving the village Twello, Netherlands. The original station was opened in 1887, closed in 1951 and reopened in 2006. It is located on the Apeldoorn–Deventer railway. The train services are operated by Nederlandse Spoorwegen.

Train services
, the following train services call at this station:
Local Sprinter service: Apeldoorn - Deventer - Almelo (- Hengelo - Enschede)

Bus services
Twello is served by a number of minibus services, designed to carry 8 people per trip.

 15 to Teuge and Apeldoorn
 170 to Epe
 171 to Deventer
 507 to Voorst-Empe station

1900 train accident

External links
NS website 
Dutch Public Transport journey planner 
Syntus Gelderland website 
Syntus Gelderland Network Map 

Railway stations in Gelderland
Railway stations opened in 1887
Voorst
1887 establishments in the Netherlands
Railway stations in the Netherlands opened in the 19th century